Arbatov (masculine) or Arbatova (feminine) is a Russian surname.

This surname is shared by the following people:

Arbatov 
 Alexei Arbatov (born 1951), Russian political scientist, academic, author and former politician
 Georgy Arbatov (1923–2010), Soviet and Russian political scientist

Arbatova 
 Maria Arbatova (born 1957), Russian novelist, playwright, journalist, talkshow host and politician

Russian-language surnames